Boven-Leeuwen is a village in the Dutch province of Gelderland. It is a part of the municipality of West Maas en Waal, and lies about 9 km east of Tiel. It is the protestant part of the former village of Leeuwen.

History 
It was first called Boven-Leeuwen in 1986 to distinguish from Beneden-Leeuwen. Leeuwen was first attested in the 12th century as Lewen, and means "settlement near burial hill". The village developed along the Waal. In 1898, a Catholic Church was built in Beneden-Leeuwen, and the village split in a Catholic (beneden) and a Protestant (boven) village.

The Dutch Reformed Church was built between 1753 and 1756. It was severely damaged in 1944/1945, and restored between 1964 and 1966. In 1918, a Catholic church was constructed in Boven-Leeuwen. Huis te Leeuwen is a manor house which was built in 1654 as an extension of a medieval house. In 1819, the estate was demolished except for the gate house and the moat. In 1840, the entire village of Leeuwen was home to 2,128 people.

People born in Boven-Leeuwen
 Airco Caravan (born 1965), artist

Gallery

References

Populated places in Gelderland
West Maas en Waal